Bear Creek No. 5 Township is one of 15 current townships in Searcy County, Arkansas, USA. As of the 2010 census, its total population was 728.

Geography

Cities, towns, and villages
Marshall (part)

References

External links
 United States Census Bureau 2008 TIGER/Line Shapefiles
 United States Board on Geographic Names (GNIS)
 United States National Atlas
 US-Counties.com
 City-Data.com
 Census 2010 U.S. Gazetteer Files: County Subdivisions in Arkansas

Townships in Searcy County, Arkansas
Townships in Arkansas